The HyperScan is a home video game console from the toy company Mattel. It is unique in that it includes as a 13.56 MHz radio-frequency identification (RFID) scanner that reads and writes to the "cards" which, in turn, activate features in and save data from the game. Players are able to enhance the abilities of their characters by scanning cards.

Games retailed for $19.99 and the console itself for $69.99 at launch, but at the end of its very short lifespan, prices of the system were down to $9.99, the games $1.99, and booster packs $0.99. There were only five titles known to have been released, with two canceled games.

Hardware 

 Sunplus SPG290 SoC implementing the S+core 32-bit microarchitecture designed by Sunplus Technology. The S+core instruction set architecture allows use of a 32/16-bit hybrid instruction mode, features Advanced Microcontroller Bus Architecture (AMBA) support and includes SJTAG for In-circuit emulation.
 UART, I²C, SPI etc.
 Composite video output (SoC supports TFT displays, but the system does not implement it)
 16 MB SDRAM system RAM
 640×480 native resolution
 65,535 colors (RGB 565 mode)
 1 USB port
 RFID scanner (13.56 MHz)
 RFID storage: 96 bytes of user memory + 8 bytes unique ID + 6 bytes of one time programmable memory. The HyperScan's RFID systems were provided by Innovision Research and Technology plc, a fabless semiconductor design house based in the UK which specializes in RFID systems and chip design.

The console uses UDF format CD-ROMs. and has two controller ports.

Software 

The games for the system were sold as $20 "Game Packs", which consisted of a game disc accompanied by six game cards (seven for Spider-Man). Additional cards which contained characters, abilities, moves and levels when scanned were part of a six-card "Booster Pack", available for $10/pack. As with most trading card packs, the cards were randomized, meaning a player looking for a certain card to unlock that element of the game may have had to buy multiple Booster Packs in order to get it (while getting multiple cards for another aspect of the game), or trade it for another with a friend, as was likely intended by the Hyperscan's card aspect.

Multiple booster packs were intended for certain games. X-Men intended to have 102 cards to unlock parts of the game in separate "red" and "black" series; the latter went unreleased due to the console's cancellation.

Though not much development for homebrew games was done on the console, several programmers have created demos and proofs-of-concepts. Some of the programs include a CD-Door demo, 3D wireframe demo, and a Bluescale demo.

Retail 

The system was sold in two varieties: a cube and a 2-player value pack. The cube box version was the version sold in stores. It included the system, controller, an X-Men game disc, and 6 X-Men cards. Two-player value packs were sold online (but may have been liquidated in stores) and included an extra controller and 12 additional X-Men cards.

The included game was rated "T" (Teen, not suitable for under age 13) and the remaining titles were rated "E10+" (not suitable for under age 10) by the ESRB.

Reception 

The system was universally panned by critics for its clunky design, broken controls, poor library, long loading screens and the unnecessary usage of cards to select characters, and was officially discontinued in 2007. It is featured as one of the ten worst systems ever by PC World magazine.

References

External links 

 Mattel Hyperscan – Ultimate Console Database
 Feature titled "THE MOST BIZARRE CONSOLE FLOPS IN GAMING HISTORY" by ADAM JAMES at SVG.com

2000s toys
Products introduced in 2006
Products and services discontinued in 2007
CD-ROM-based consoles
Mattel consoles
Seventh-generation video game consoles
Sunplus-based video game consoles